was a town located in Katori District, Chiba Prefecture, Japan.

During the Edo period, the area of present-day Shimofusa was part of Takaoka Domain, a minor feudal domain of the Tokugawa shogunate. Modern Namekawa Village was established on April 1, 1889. On February 11, 1955, it merged with the villages of Takaoka and Komikado to form the town of Shimofusa.

On March 27, 2006, Shimofusa, along with the town of Taiei (also from Katori District), was merged into the expanded city of Narita, and thus no longer exists as an independent municipality.

Education

Shimofusa High School (千葉県立下総高等学校) is located in the former town.

References

External links
 Town of Shimofusa  (Archive)
 Narita official website 

Dissolved municipalities of Chiba Prefecture
Narita, Chiba